The spot-backed antshrike (Hypoedaleus guttatus) is a species of bird in the family Thamnophilidae. It is the only member of the genus Hypoedaleus. It is found in southeastern Brazil, eastern Paraguay and far northeastern Argentina. Its natural habitat is subtropical or tropical moist lowland forest.

The spot-backed antshrike was described by the French ornithologist Louis Jean Pierre Vieillot in 1816 and given the binomial name Thamnophilus guttatus. The genus Hypoedaleus  was erected by the German ornithologists Jean Cabanis and Ferdinand Heine in 1860 with the spot-backed antshrike as the type species. The specific name is from the Latin guttatus meaning "spotted" or "speckled". The name of the genus is from the Ancient Greek hupoidaleos meaning "somewhat swollen". There are no recognised subspecies.

References

spot-backed antshrike
Birds of the Atlantic Forest
spot-backed antshrike
Taxa named by Louis Jean Pierre Vieillot
Taxonomy articles created by Polbot